A Thousand Billion Dollars is a 1982 French thriller film directed by Henri Verneuil and starring Patrick Dewaere. It tells the story of a young French journalist who discovers how an American company is using assassinations and other criminal methods to take over French industries.

The film was released in France on 10 February 1982. It recorded 1,190,673 admissions in its domestic market.

Cast
 Patrick Dewaere as Paul Kerjean
 Michel Auclair as Michel Saint-Claude
 Caroline Cellier as Hélène Kerjean
 Charles Denner as Walter
 Anny Duperey as Laura Weber
 Jeanne Moreau as Mme Benoît-Lambert
 Mel Ferrer as Cornelius A. Woeagen
 Fernand Ledoux as Guérande
 Jean Mercure as Holstein
 Jean-Pierre Kalfon as the informant
 Jean-Laurent Cochet as Hartmann
 André Falcon as Pierre Bayen
 Claude Marcault as Kerjean's secretary
 Jacques Maury as Jack Sleiter
 Jacqueline Doyen as Arlène Robert

References

1982 thriller films
1982 films
Films directed by Henri Verneuil
Films scored by Philippe Sarde
French thriller films
1980s French-language films
1980s French films